Mad Bodies is a homebrew Breakout-style/shoot 'em up video game developed and published by FORCE Design exclusively for the Atari Jaguar on May 2, 2009. It is the first and only title to be released for the platform as of date by FORCE Design.

In Mad Bodies, the player takes control of the "ETHunter" space crew in an attempt to stop an entity known as The Graphics Man, who fused reality with his mind to reign supreme, by entering the Dark Knight Games tournament co-hosted by Dave Vaporware. Originally intended for the Atari Jaguar CD add-on, the game was developed over the course of more than six years. It received positive reception for its presentation and originality, however, it was criticized for its high difficulty.

Gameplay 

Mad Bodies is a Breakout-style vertically scrolling shooter game that heavily borrows elements from Gottlieb's Mad Planets, where the player controls the "ETHunter" space vessel as a paddle in order to either ricochet the planetoids (which act as balls) back and forth or destroy them by manually aiming the paddle's reticle to the target and shoot against them as the main objective across ten rounds, with each one increasing in difficulty as the player progress further on the game. In addition with the planetoids, the player must also shoot against incoming enemies from the top of the screen, which come as a group of five ships, but there are occasions where they only come as a group of three instead and are capable of shooting at the player's paddle, while more enemy types are introduced in later rounds.

Managing to successfully destroy a group of enemies will increase the player's score five times than normal. The paddle can only withstand five hits from enemy fire and it deteriorates as well if the player fails to rebound the planetoids or by crashing against enemy ships. However, if the paddle collides with a meteor, the player instantly loses a stock of their lives and once all lives are lost, the game is over, though the player has the option of continuing before the timer reaches zero and they will be mocked by the character at the continue screen depending on how long it takes to keep playing. The game will also rank the player at the high-score screen depending on how many continues were used during gameplay. After every 3000 points, an extra life is granted.

When reaching the third round, stranded astronauts and satellites are introduced and the former must be picked up with the edge of the paddle's reticle to rescue them. Gathering enough astronauts with the reticle and delivering them to the satellites will give the player a power-up item that is picked up by either with the paddle itself or by shooting at it, granting the ability to launch the paddle as a slingshot. However, if the player keeps gathering enough astronauts but does not deliver them to the satellites will increase the paddle's firepower and when powered up, it will grant the ability to shoot lasers. Powering up is also the only way to restore the paddle back to normal but if the player touches the astronauts with the paddle, however, they will be pushed off-screen. At the end of the fifth and tenth rounds, a boss is introduced and the player must rebound their orange projectiles two times in a row to turn them purple in order to deal damage at the boss, while their pattern becomes more erratic as they take more damage during the fight.

Development and release 
Mad Bodies was conceived and developed by a small team at FORCE Design, an American company founded in 1998 by college graduate and freelance artist Terance Williams a year before Hasbro Interactive released the patents and rights to the Atari Jaguar into public domain in 1999 by declaring it as an open platform and opening the doors for homebrew development as a result, becoming one of the few independent developers committed to the Jaguar at the time. However, Williams stated in an online interview that FORCE Design was formed earlier in 1995. The game was jointly programmed by Scott Walters and Terance, who also created the hand-drawn graphics and worked as the project's sole level designer, in addition of creating the sound effects. The music was composed by Aki Nordman, with assistance from both Terance and 3D Stooges Software Studios CEO Steven Scavone. The title was originally intended to be released for the Atari Jaguar CD add-on, but the plan was abandoned during development in 2004 and the game was instead published on the cartridge format. Development lasted between six and eight years.

Mad Bodies was first showcased across various events such as Midwest Gaming Classic in 2003. It was later displayed and playable to the public at the JagFest booth during the Cleveland Classic Console and Arcade Gaming Show in 2004, albeit in an early state of completion. The game was officially released on May 2, 2009 as a limited run for US$79.99 and came packaged in a clamshell case, although a one-of-a-kind packaging mimicking an officially licensed Jaguar release does exists in the hands of a video game collector. Prior to its launch, it received a teaser trailer featuring extremely rough hand-drawn artwork. The title received coverage from gaming news websites such as Kotaku and The Escapist for being on a console deemed as a commercial failure. After release, the game has been showcased at Jaguar-dedicated festivals such as E-JagFest.

Reception 

Mad Bodies received positive reception from the few video game-dedicated outlets that reviewed the game when it launched, due to being released long after the system was discontinued. Classic Video Gamer Magazine'''s Mike Pittaro praised the presentation, visuals, music and originality, though he criticized the game's high difficulty but remarked that "MB is a frustrating experience that delivers, without a doubt, endless hours of gameplay". Thumbpad also gave a positive review to the game in their May 29, 2009 podcast and gave it a two thumbs-up rating. In contrast, Peter G. of Video Game Trader magazine commended the music but criticized its gameplay for being confusing.

 Legacy Mad Bodies remains the only completed and shipped title by FORCE Design as of date and was part from one of the many projects in development by the group for the Jaguar platform and possibly for other systems, as the company has more titles planned to be released; CRAZE (a multidirectional shooter similar to Berzerk and its sequel), Legion Force Jidai: The Next Era! (a Metal Slug-inspired run and gun project), Gp Earth GOD's Troopers (a shoot 'em up in vein of Gorf), Battle Puzzler! (a tile-matching puzzle fighting game akin to Super Puzzle Fighter II Turbo), a sports game called Black Jag: Hyper Power League and a Q*bert-esque action-puzzle game project titled MightyFrog'', among others that remain in development hell. Some of them have received updates in the form of image/video previews, while others had a demo released or showcased to the public.

References

External links 
 
 Mad Bodies at AtariAge
 Mad Bodies at Atarimania

2009 video games
Atari Jaguar games
Atari Jaguar-only games
Homebrew software
Paddle-and-ball video games
Science fiction video games
Single-player video games
Vertically scrolling shooters
Video games developed in the United States
Video games set in outer space